The 1978 IHF Women's Cup Winner's Cup was the second edition of IHF's competition for women's team handball national cup champions. It was contested by 15 teams, two more than the inaugural edition and ran from 22 January to 23 April 1978. Ferencvárosi TC tightly defeated 2-times European champion SC Leipzig in the final to win its first international trophy.

Bracket

References

Women's EHF Cup Winners' Cup
1978 in handball